The Nebraska, Topeka, Iola and Memphis Railroad was founded June 17, 1881 and operated sixteen miles between Walnut, Kansas and Girard, Kansas.  It may have originally been planned as a Frisco Railroad branch extension from Joplin, MO.  On January 1, 1884, it was leased by the Southern Kansas Railroad but was foreclosed on three weeks later.  On February 6, 1884, it emerged as the Crawford County Railroad which was then acquired nine days later by the Kansas Southern Railroad.

Defunct Kansas railroads
Predecessors of the Atchison, Topeka and Santa Fe Railway
Railway companies established in 1881
Railway companies disestablished in 1884
1881 establishments in Kansas
American companies disestablished in 1884
American companies established in 1881